Ethan Britto (born 30 November 2000) is a Gibraltarian footballer who plays for Lincoln Red Imps and the Gibraltar national team. Primarily a left-back, he can also play anywhere along the left flank and has often been utilised as a winger in a front three.

Club career
Britto began his career at Lincoln Red Imps, breaking through at the age of 15. In January 2017, he joined Europa Point on loan along with 4 other players including Jaron Vinet and Tjay De Barr, to gain experienced at the newly promoted side. However, despite scoring twice in 11 games he was unable to prevent the side's relegation and returned to Lincoln at the end of the season. In summer 2018, he moved to Mons Calpe in order to gain more first team football, but again returned to Lincoln the next summer amidst financial problems for the Calpeans. Despite limited opportunities, Britto still impressed and earned a trial at UD Las Palmas alongside Julian Del Rio in February 2020.

International career
Britto made his international debut for Gibraltar on 13 October 2018, coming on as a substitute in the 85th minute for Andrew Hernandez in the 2018–19 UEFA Nations League D match against Armenia. The match finished as a 1–0 away win for Gibraltar, their first ever competitive victory.

Career statistics

International

Honours
Lincoln Red Imps
Gibraltar Premier Division / Gibraltar National League: 2017–18, 2020–21
Rock Cup: 2016

References

External links
 
 
 
 

2000 births
Living people
Gibraltarian footballers
Gibraltar youth international footballers
Gibraltar under-21 international footballers
Gibraltar international footballers
Association football fullbacks
Lincoln Red Imps F.C. players
Europa Point F.C. players
Mons Calpe S.C. players
Gibraltar Premier Division players